Acenaphthene is a polycyclic aromatic hydrocarbon (PAH) consisting of naphthalene with an ethylene bridge connecting positions 1 and 8.  It is a colourless solid.  Coal tar consists of about 0.3% of this compound.

Production and reactions
Acenaphthene was prepared the first time from coal tar by Marcellin Berthelot. Later Berthelot and Bardy synthesized the compound by cyclization of α-ethylnaphthalene.  Industrially, it is still obtained from coal tar together with its derivative acenaphthylene (and many other compounds).

Like other arenes, acenaphthene forms complexes with low valent metal centers.  One example is (η6-acenaphthene)Mn(CO)3]+.

Uses
It is used on a large scale to prepare naphthalene dicarboxylic anhydride, which is a precursor to dyes and optical brighteners.  Naphthalene dicarboxylic anhydride is the precursor to perylenetetracarboxylic dianhydride, precursor to several commercial pigments and dyes.

References

Polycyclic aromatic hydrocarbons
Tricyclic compounds